Twenty Tens (I've Been Smoking All Night) is the first EP by the Irish rock band Virgin Prunes. It was released on 8 January 1981 by Baby Records.

Formats and track listing 
All songs written by the Virgin Prunes.

UK 7-inch EP (baby 001)

Personnel 

Virgin Prunes
 Dave-iD Busaras – vocals
 Binttii – drums
 Dik Evans – guitar
 Gavin Friday – vocals
 Guggi – vocals
 Strongman – bass guitar

Technical personnel
 George Peckham – mastering
 Mayo Thompson – production
 Paul Thomas – production
 Virgin Prunes – production

Charts

References

External links 
 

1981 debut EPs
Virgin Prunes albums